The Arizona Department of Public Safety (AZDPS) is a state-level law enforcement agency with a primary function of patrolling and enforcing state laws on Arizona highways. Director Heston Silbert was promoted from Deputy Director to Director in April 2020, upon the retirement of former Director Frank Milstead. Their headquarters are in Phoenix.

History
Following legislation in 1968, the Arizona Department of Public Safety was established by the executive order of Arizona Governor Jack Williams on July 1, 1969. This order amalgamated the functions and responsibilities of the Arizona Highway Patrol, the Law Enforcement Division of the state Department of Liquor Licenses and Control, and the Narcotics Division of the state Department of Law.

In its 50-plus years of service, the department has become an organization dedicated to protecting and providing state-level law enforcement services to the public, and developing partnerships with agencies sharing similar missions.

In 2015, a Rebranding effort began.  First, the Title of "officer" was changed to "State Trooper" to more align   with other Highway Patrol agencies nationally. Second, and most visible to the public,  the white and  blue police car was changed entirely to a silver and black paint scheme.  The cars are the most visible part of DPS, and the paint/logo scheme had not changed in 50 years.

The department consists of five divisions: Office of the Director, Highway Patrol, Criminal Investigations, Technical Services, and Agency Support. Together, these five divisions provide scientific, technical, operational, and regulatory services to Arizona residents, and to the state's criminal justice community; one of the more famous subdivisions of the Criminal Investigations Division is the "Gang and Immigration Intelligence Team Enforcement Mission" task force (better known as "GIITEM"), which was formed to combat the growing gang infestation problems mainly in Maricopa County (the Phoenix area), even though their jurisdiction is statewide.

In 2011, the Arizona State Capitol Police department was merged with DPS, alongside the Highway Patrol Division. ASCP was responsible for the State Capitol Mall in Phoenix and the Tucson State Complex. Today, the Capitol Police still exists and patrols the Capitol grounds, but they are now full DPS officers, and use DPS cars, logos, and uniforms. Capitol police officers wear special Capitol Police patches on their uniforms.

In 2022, a pilot program was initiated to assign ADOT commercial enforcement officers to the DPS commercial enforcement division.

The department-issued vehicles of the Arizona DPS include the Ford Police Interceptor Utility, Ford Police Interceptor Sedan, Chevrolet Tahoe PPV, and Dodge Charger Pursuit. The handgun issued as the department weapon is the Glock 17 Generation 5, chambered in 9MM, and carried with three to four 17-round magazines. The long guns issued as department weapons are the Colt AR15A2, Colt M16A2, or Colt M4, supplied with two 30-round magazines. The 12-gauge Remington 870 shotguns are not authorized for carrying and have been modified for less-lethal munitions. SWAT Troopers are issued selective fire, short-barreled rifles.

Counter Terrorism Information Center

Since 2004 the ADPS has maintained the Arizona Counter Terrorism Information Center (ACTIC), a fusion center that operates 24/7 with the Arizona Department of Homeland Security, FBI and other agencies.

Agency Support Division 
The Agency Support Division supports DPS and other allied agencies in the state.  Key services include but are not limited to Air Support Bureau, Human resources, Facilities, Fleet, and Support Services.

Aviation Bureau 
The Aviation Bureau manages the air assets of DPS, the most important of these is the Ranger Air Rescue Program. The program has 4 bases located in Phoenix, Flagstaff, Kingman and Tucson.  The Program provides SAR, Physical Rescue, (long line, hoist, Short haul, and Rappel) and other logistical support, like wildland "Bambi Bucket" water drops to aid in wildland firefighting. Aeromedical transport is available if traditional services are not .  All Helicopters are Bell 407s and one Bell 429. Crew staffing is 1 pilot and one Paramedic flight observer.

In 2015, the assets of Arizona Dept. of Transportation and DPS were combined under DPS's umbrella.   There are now a total of 15 aircraft assigned.

OPCOMM 
OPCOMM is the Operational Communications Bureau, the dispatch and 9-1-1 answering point for DPS.  There are 2 Dispatch centers, Phoenix , and Tucson.  A Third Center used to operate in Flagstaff for the northern counties but closed in 2020 due to lack of available staff.  They dispatch for the entire agency, including Task forces, such as GITTEM, Criminal Investigations and the Aviation Bureau. 100 personnel assigned answer over 700,000 calls for service each year.

Rank structure

Old ranks
The ranks of lieutenant and commander were abolished and converted to captain and major respectively in 2010. On July 24, 2015, officers officially became known as State Troopers.

Demographics
As of July 2018 (Note: Numbers are rounded to the nearest whole number):

Fallen officers
Since the establishment of the Arizona Department of Public Safety, 30 troopers and 4 K9s have died while on duty. The agency, along with the Arizona Highway Patrol Association, remembers each fallen officer at an annual memorial ceremony on the first Monday of May.

See also
 List of law enforcement agencies in Arizona
 State police
 Highway patrol

References

External links
 Arizona Department of Public Safety
 Arizona Department of Homeland Security
 Arizona Agencies
 Arizona Division of Emergency Management
 Ready.gov
 Arizona Highway Patrol Association

History of Arizona
Public Safety
Highway Patrol
Public Safety
Government agencies established in 1969
1969 establishments in Arizona